Kayalar is a village in the Şemdinli District in Hakkâri Province in Turkey. The village is populated by Kurds of the Zerzan tribe and had a population of 1,872 in 2022.

Kayalar has seven hamlets attached to it: Erikli, Husrova, Mağaraönü, Sarıca, Seçkin, Kule and Yukarıkayalar.

Population 
Population history of the village from 2007 to 2022:

References 

Villages in Şemdinli District
Kurdish settlements in Hakkâri Province